Malvasia is an Italian surname. Notable people with the name include:

 Carlo Cesare Malvasia (1616–1693), Italian scholar and art historian
 Cornelio Malvasia (1603 - 1664), Italian aristocrat, patron of astronomy and military leader
 Diodata Malvasia (c. 1532 - post-1617), Italian nun within the convent of San Mattia in Bologna

See also 

 Malvasia